The Fotomuseum Den Haag (The Hague Museum of Photography) is a museum in the field of photography in The Hague. The museum was founded in 2002 as part of the Kunstmuseum Den Haag and works closely with the Print Room of the Leiden University Library.

Building 
The museum is located next to the Kunstmuseum The Hague in the Schamhart Wing (1961-1962) designed by the architects Sjoerd Schamhart and J.F. Heijligers. This exhibition wing was built as an extension of the Haags Gemeentemuseum.

The Photo Museum was expanded from 400 to 1,000 square meters in 2016 at the expense of GEM for contemporary art museum, also located in the building. This created the opportunity and space, in addition to the work of established names in the photography world, to show smaller historical exhibitions and the work of promising emerging talent.

Exhibitions 

Each year, the Fotomuseum Den Haag organizes approximately six exhibitions on the most diverse periods, disciplines and genres of photographic history, whereby the focus is often on the image of man.

In exhibition current photographers, such as Desiree Dolron, Loretta Lux and Gregory Crewdson, are alternated with overviews of classics such as Emmy Andriesse, Edward S. Curtis and Leonard Freed. 

Underexposed and unknown reputations and oeuvres are prominently presented by the Photo Museum The Hague, such as those of Gerard Fieret, Willem van de Poll and the Dutch years of fashion photographer Erwin Blumenfeld. 

Socially relevant photo projects by contemporary photographers are regularly shown, such as the series on the International Criminal Tribunal for the former Yugoslavia by Friso Keuris, the intimate sexual intercourse between older people by Marrie Bot or the primeval landscapes threatened by man by Anja de Jong.

Annual photo price 
From 2006 to 2015, the museum was associated with an important annual photo prize: the Silver Camera for press photography in the Netherlands.  Also from 2009 to 2013, The Photo Academy Award was also associated with the Fotomuseum Den Haag.

Organization 
The Photo Museum The Hague is part of the Kunstmuseum The Hague. The director is Benno Tempel, deputy director is Hans Buurman and the curator of the photo museum is Wim van Sinderen.

References 
 ''This article contains a translation of Fotomuseum Den Haag from nl.wikipedia. (59479492 et seq.)

External links 
 Fotomuseum Den Haag, website

Museums in The Hague
Photography museums and galleries in the Netherlands
Art museums established in 2002